Académica Petróleo Kwanda Soyo best known as Académica do Soyo, is an Angolan football club based in Soyo, in the province of Zaire. They play their home games at the Estádio dos Imbondeiros. The club was relegated from the Angolan Premier Division, Girabola in the end of the 2007 championship.

A court decision issued in 2018 determined the club's assets including the stadium and head-office to be seized.

Performance in CAF competitions
CAF Confederation Cup: 1 appearance
2010 – First Round

League & Cup Positions

Players

2002–2014

Manager history

See also
 Girabola
 Gira Angola

References

Football clubs in Angola
Sports clubs in Angola
Association football clubs established in 1987
1987 establishments in Angola
Soyo